Teboho Aaron Mokoena  (born 25 November 1980), known as Aaron Mokoena, is a South African former footballer. He is currently the assistant coach of Cape Town City.

Club career

Early career
Mokoena was born in Boipatong. He moved to Bayer Leverkusen and Ajax, before twice being loaned out to Germinal Beerschot and then transferring to KRC Genk for two years. On 4 January 2005, aged 24 he moved to Premier League side Blackburn Rovers in which he described his move as a dream.

Blackburn Rovers
Mokoena made his debut for Blackburn on 8 January 2005 in an FA Cup match against Cardiff City, coming on as a 43rd-minute substitute for Barry Ferguson. After this, Mark Hughes mainly utilised Mokoena as a holding midfielder. Mokoena went on to be a regular in the starting line-up for the remainder of the season, appearing 22 times in total. He was used by Hughes as the holding midfielder in a three-man midfield in a defensive 4–5–1 formation, a move which saw Blackburn concede fewer goals and move away from relegation danger.

Hughes later reverted to a 4–4–2 formation. From then on, Mokoena found himself used sparingly as a holding midfielder in his favoured 4–5–1 formation as a second-half substitute, charged with protecting leads in games in which Blackburn were winning. With Robbie Savage out injured for Rovers, Mokoena started most of the team's games in 2007 and he scored his first goal for Blackburn in an FA Cup 6th round victory against Manchester City on 11 March 2007. However, he was later sent off after getting a second yellow card. He scored his second and final Blackburn goal against Sunderland in February 2009, again this time in the FA Cup replay in Rovers' 2–1 win at Ewood Park which was also voted as goal of the season for the 2008–09 season. Mokoena played his final game for Blackburn Rovers on 24 May 2009 against West Bromwich Albion at Ewood Park in the 0–0 draw.

Portsmouth
On 24 May 2009, Mokoena announced he would be joining fellow Premier League outfit Portsmouth on a three-year deal. He scored his first goal for Portsmouth in the last minute of extra time to give them victory over Coventry City at the Ricoh Arena in the dying seconds in the FA Cup third round replay on 12 January 2010. Mokoena played a major part in the games against Coventry, Sunderland, South Coast rivals Southampton, Birmingham and Tottenham. He stated that he desired the move to secure regular football, especially in the run up to the 2010 World Cup held in South Africa his native.

Mokoena scored his first league goal in English football (having previously scored three in the FA Cup) when he netted on 58 minutes and completed the full 90 minutes in a 3–1 victory over Bristol City at Fratton Park on 28 September 2010.

On 28 October 2010, Mokoena signed a new two-and-a-half-year deal with Pompey lasting until summer 2013. He made 70 appearances and has scored three goals for Portsmouth in all competitions. On 18 June 2011, he said that he could be leaving Portsmouth because he has been very frustrated at being on the bench on a regular basis.

Following Portsmouth going into administration in February 2012 and the club's subsequent relegation into the third-tier Football League One, Mokoena was identified a potential key player to leave due to his relatively high salary. During this time Mokoena was strongly linked with a transfer to Bidvest Wits and did not show up to the first day of pre-season training. On 10 July, Portsmouth manager Michael Appleton stated that he believed Mokoena would leave Portsmouth within 24 hours.

On 12 July 2012, Mokoena agreed a contract termination with Portsmouth.

Bidvest Wits
On 11 July 2012 Mokoena completed his move from Portsmouth to Bidvest Wits. On 20 July, he was officially presented at his new club.

International 
Mokoena is known as "Mbazo" or "The Axe" because of his tough tackling skills. He is the youngest ever player to have represented South Africa, having played in 1999 for the 2000 Summer Olympics qualifiers aged 18–19; he later replaced Lucas Radebe as captain of his country. He played for South Africa at the 2000 Olympics, where they finished third in Group D.

Mokoena also played at the 2002 and 2004 Africa Cup of Nations. In January 2008, Mokoena captained South Africa in the 2008 Africa Cup of Nations in Ghana. He retained the captaincy for the 2009 Confederations Cup and 2010 FIFA World Cup, both held in his homeland. On 31 May 2010, he was named in South Africa's 23-man World Cup squad.

He won his 100th cap against Guatemala in Polokwane in a 5–0 win on 3 May 2010, and celebrated by taking to the field wearing the number 100 on the back of his shirt. On 11 June 2010, he captained Bafana Bafana in the opening group game against Mexico of the 2010 World Cup and also played the full 90 minutes alongside Bongani Khumalo in a 1–1 draw in Johannesburg. On 16 June 2010, Mokoena again skippered the Bafana Bafana this time in their 3–0 defeat by Uruguay at the Loftus Versfeld Stadium. On 22 June, he started in the 2–1 win over France at the Free State Stadium in Bloemfontein. As of 2012, Mokoena has won 107 caps for his country and has scored 1 goal since debuting back in 1999.

International goals
Scores and results list South Africa's goal tally first, score column indicates score after Mokoena goal.

See also
 List of men's footballers with 100 or more international caps

References

External links

1980 births
Living people
People from Boipatong
South African Sotho people
South African soccer players
Association football defenders
Association football midfielders
Association football utility players
South Africa international soccer players
Olympic soccer players of South Africa
Footballers at the 2000 Summer Olympics
2002 FIFA World Cup players
2010 FIFA World Cup players
2009 FIFA Confederations Cup players
1998 African Cup of Nations players
2008 Africa Cup of Nations players
Jomo Cosmos F.C. players
Bayer 04 Leverkusen players
Eredivisie players
AFC Ajax players
Belgian Pro League players
Beerschot A.C. players
K.R.C. Genk players
Premier League players
Blackburn Rovers F.C. players
Portsmouth F.C. players
Bidvest Wits F.C. players
FIFA Century Club
English Football League players
Soccer players from Gauteng
FA Cup Final players
South African expatriate soccer players
South African expatriate sportspeople in Germany
Expatriate footballers in Germany
South African expatriate sportspeople in the Netherlands
Expatriate footballers in the Netherlands
South African expatriate sportspeople in Belgium
Expatriate footballers in Belgium
South African expatriate sportspeople in England
Expatriate footballers in England